Andrzej Sebastian Duda (born 16 May 1972) is a Polish lawyer and politician who has served as president of Poland since 6 August 2015. Before becoming president, Andrzej Duda was a member of the Polish Lower House (Sejm) from 2011 to 2014 and the European Parliament from 2014 to 2015.

Andrzej Duda was the presidential candidate for the Law and Justice party (PiS) during the presidential election in May 2015. In the first round of voting, he received 5,179,092 votes – 34.76% of valid votes. In the second round of voting, he received 51.55% of the vote, beating the incumbent president Bronisław Komorowski, who received 48.45% of the vote. On 26 May 2015, Andrzej Duda resigned his party membership as the president-elect.

On 24 October 2019, he received the official support of PiS ahead of his re-election campaign in 2020. He finished first in the first round and then went on to defeat Rafał Trzaskowski in the runoff with 10,440,648 votes or 51.03% of the vote.

Early life and education 
Duda was born on 16 May 1972 in Kraków, to Janina (Milewska) and Jan Tadeusz Duda, professors at the AGH University of Science and Technology. His grandfather fought in the Polish–Soviet War and later was a member of the Home Army during the Second World War.

Between 1987 and 1991, Duda attended Jan III Sobieski High School, Kraków, where he excelled in Humanities. He subsequently studied law at the Jagiellonian University, and earned a law degree. In 2001, he was appointed as a research assistant in the Department of Administrative Law of the Jagiellonian University's Faculty of Law and Administration. In January 2005, Duda earned a Doctor of Law degree (LL.D.) at the Jagiellonian University. Due to his political career, he has been mostly on unpaid leave from the university since September 2006, except for a 13-month interval beginning in September 2010, when he returned to the university. Additionally, he was a lecturer at Mieszko I College of Education and Administration, Poznań.

Political career 

Duda began his political career with the now defunct Freedom Union Party in the early 2000s. After the parliamentary elections in 2005, he began his collaboration with the Law and Justice Party (PiS). From 2006 to 2007, he was an undersecretary of state in the Ministry of Justice. Then, from 2007 to 2008, he was a member of the Polish State Tribunal.

From 2008 to 2010, during the presidency of Lech Kaczyński, Duda was an undersecretary of state in the Chancellery of the President. In 2010, he was an unsuccessful candidate to become the Mayor of Kraków as a PiS candidate, but was more successful in the 2011 parliamentary election, where he received 79,981 votes for the Kraków area, and thus became a member of the Sejm.

In September 2013, the news magazine Polityka commended Duda for being one of the most active members of parliament, describing him as being open to opposition arguments and as refraining from personal attacks, as part of his role at the Commission for Constitutional Responsibility. Duda remained a member of the Sejm until he was elected to the European Parliament in 2014.

2015 presidential campaign 

As Bronisław Komorowski's presidential term was expiring, Komorowski was able to seek re-election in a scheduled presidential election. Duda was Komorowski's Law and Justice rival in the election.

In the first round of the 2015 presidential election, Duda came first, receiving 5,179,092 votes and thus 34.76% of valid votes.

In the second round Duda took 51.55% of the vote against the 48.45% share of his rival, the incumbent president Bronisław Komorowski. On 26 May 2015, he officially resigned from party membership.

2020 presidential campaign 

In the first round of the 2020 presidential election, Duda appeared to come in first, receiving almost 44% of the votes. Warsaw mayor Rafał Trzaskowski came in second, with just over 30% of the vote. The second round took place on 12 July. Duda won reelection.

Presidency (2015–present) 

The first five-year term of Andrzej Duda began on 6 August 2015 with taking an oath of office during a National Assembly session.

Duda rejected the European Union's proposal of migrant quotas to redistribute asylum seekers, saying: "I won’t agree to a dictate of the strong. I won’t back a Europe where the economic advantage of the size of a population will be a reason to force solutions on other countries regardless of their national interests".

In September 2015 Prime Minister Ewa Kopacz declared that Poland, as an expression of “European solidarity”, would take in 2,000 people over the next two years, mainly from Syria and Eritrea (out of 3,700 originally requested).

Duda and Croatian President Kolinda Grabar-Kitarović were the originators of the Three Seas Initiative.

Duda repeatedly met with general secretary of the Chinese Communist Party, Xi Jinping, stating that "Polish companies will benefit hugely" from China's Belt and Road Initiative. Duda and Xi signed a declaration on strategic partnership in which they reiterated that Poland and China viewed each other as long-term strategic partners. Duda said that he hopes Poland will become a gateway to Europe for China.

In September 2017, his approval rating stood at 71% and in February 2018, at 72%, a record surpassed only by Aleksander Kwaśniewski, whose approval ratings surpassed 75% from 1995 to 2005.

Pardon of Mariusz Kamiński

In November 2015, on the basis of Article 139 of the Constitution of Poland, Duda pardoned former Central Anticorruption Bureau (CBA) head Mariusz Kamiński and three CBA officers convicted by a court of 1st instance in the so-called "Land Affair", marking the first pardon granted by a president before reaching a final verdict. According to some lawyers (including professors Jan Zimmermann – Andrzej Duda's doctorate promoter, Leszek Kubicki – former Minister of Justice and Andrzej Zoll – former president of the Constitutional Tribunal) Duda breached the Constitution of Poland.

Constitutional crisis 

Andrzej Duda refused to swear in any of the five Constitutional Tribunal judge candidates selected by the Sejm of the VII term. Three of them had been selected since 7 November 2015 whose election was declared constitutional. On 3 and 9 December 2015 Duda swore in five other candidates for the same office selected by the Sejm of the VIII term.
On 28 December 2015, Duda signed the Constitutional Tribunal bill (passed on 22 December 2015 by the Sejm), which unequivocally breaches the Constitution of Poland according to the National Council of the Judiciary of Poland, the Public Prosecutor General and the Polish Ombudsman.

In June 2016, Duda rejected appointing 10 judges selected by the National Council of the Judiciary of Poland.

In July 2017, Duda informed the public he had decided to veto two controversial judicial bills backed by the government and passed by both houses of the Polish parliament. The President's spokesman subsequently said that the third act – the common courts bill – would be signed. The veto was just one example of Duda opposing the policies of PiS.

Politics of memory; the Holocaust 
In February 2018, Duda said that he would sign into law the Amendment to the Act on the Institute of National Remembrance, making it illegal to accuse 'the Polish nation' of complicity in the Holocaust and other Nazi German atrocities, a measure that has roiled relations with Israel, with Prime Minister Benjamin Netanyahu going as far as accusing the Polish government of "Holocaust denial".

In September 2022, Duda and his wife attended the funeral of Holocaust survivor Edward Mosberg in the United States, and Duda announced that he was awarding Mosberg the Grand Cross of the Order of Merit of the Republic of Poland, the highest Polish award in its class. He awarded it in recognition of Mosberg's achievements in advancing Polish-Jewish dialogue and developing cooperation between nations, and for preserving the memory of and communicating what happened in the Holocaust.

Stance on LGBT rights 

In June 2020, Duda said that he would not allow gay couples to marry or adopt children, while describing the LGBT movement as "a foreign ideology" and comparing it to indoctrination in the Soviet Union. He also pledged he would ban LGBT teaching in schools. In response to Duda's comments, former Prime Minister of Belgium Elio Di Rupo publicly asked the European Commission for an official reaction. Soon after his comments, Duda invited presidential candidate Robert Biedroń (who had asked to meet the President) and an LGBT activist, Bartosz Staszewski, to the Presidential Palace, though Robert Biedroń eventually turned down the invitation, refusing to meet President Duda until he apologized. According to Staszewski, during their meeting Duda cited freedom of speech to defend his words about "LGBT ideology".

On 4 July 2020, Duda proposed changing the constitution to ban LGBT couples from adopting children. On 6 July 2020, he signed a document with a presidential draft of the amendment to the Polish Constitution.

Foreign policy 

U.S. President Donald Trump praised Duda, saying: "He's doing a terrific job." In September 2019, Trump and Duda agreed to send 1,000 U.S. troops to Poland.

On 24 June 2020, Trump said at a press conference with Duda that the United States planned to move some U.S. troops from Germany to Poland. Trump said that "Poland is one of the few countries that are fulfilling their obligations under NATO — in particular, their monetary obligations — and they asked us if we would send some additional troops. They're going to pay for that."

Personal life 
Duda is married to Agata Kornhauser-Duda, a teacher of German at Jan III Sobieski High School in Kraków. They met as high school students, at a party. The couple have been married since 21 December 1994. They have one daughter, Kinga (born 1995). Duda's father-in-law is Julian Kornhauser, a well-known writer, translator and literary critic.

Duda is a keen skier, he participated in the Polish Academic Championships in Alpine skiing while he was a university student.

Duda is a practising Roman Catholic. He took part in religious ceremonies on many occasions, including Midnight Mass, the blessing of food on Holy Saturday, or the Corpus Christi procession in Kraków.

Honours

National Honours
 : Order of the White Eagle (ex officio)
 : Grand Cross of the Order of Polonia Restituta (ex officio)

Foreign Honours
 : Gran Cordon of the Order of Leopold (2015)
 : I Class Order of Stara Planina (Стара планина) (14 April 2016)
 : Collar of the Order of the White Lion (15 March 2016)
 : Grand Cross with Collar Order of the White Rose of Finland (2017)
 : Grand Cross of the Order of the Redeemer (2017)
 : Commander Grand Cross with Chain of the Order of the Three Stars (2018)
 : Grand Cross with Golden Chain of the Order of Vytautas the Great (21 February 2019)
 : Grand Cross of the Royal Norwegian Order of St. Olav (23 May 2016)
 : Grand Cross of the Order of Merit Grand Cross (2008)
 : Collar of the Order of the Star of Romania (10 July 2016)
 : Grand Cross of the Order of the White Double Cross (2019)
 : Grand Cross of the Hungarian Order of Merit (2020)
 : Order of Prince Yaroslav the Wise, 1st class (2021)
 : Gold Olympic Order (23 July 2022)
 : Grand Cross of the Order 8-September (24 October 2022)

References

External links 

 Official Biography of President Andrzej Duda
 The official website of the President of the Republic of Poland
 Polish Sejm
 Wprost 

|-

|-

1972 births
Candidates in the 2015 Polish presidential election
Candidates in the 2020 Polish presidential election
Jagiellonian University alumni
Law and Justice politicians
Living people
MEPs for Poland 2009–2014
MEPs for Poland 2014–2019
People from Kraków
Polish lawyers
Polish Roman Catholics
Presidents of Poland
Members of the Polish Sejm 2011–2015
Recipients of the Order of the White Eagle (Poland)
Grand Crosses of the Order of Polonia Restituta
Collars of the Order of the White Lion
Recipients of the Order of the Three Stars
Grand Crosses with Golden Chain of the Order of Vytautas the Great
Grand Crosses of the Order of Merit (Portugal)
Grand Crosses of the Order of the Star of Romania
Grand Crosses of the Order of Merit of the Republic of Hungary (civil)
Recipients of the Order of Prince Yaroslav the Wise, 1st class
Recipients of the Olympic Order